Hank Fisher, (born 1954) more commonly known as Washboard Hank is a Canadian musician, songwriter and stage performer. He was born in Peterborough, Ontario in 1954. He plays a number of instruments, including banjo, guitar and percussion. He is known for his unusual performances with self-created instruments. In 2016 he performed with his band, the Wringers.

Fisher is a regular performer at children's events, including the Peterborough Folk Festival.  He creates and plays improvised instruments, including his "signature" washboard. and kitchen sink tuba.  He sings humorous traditional tunes such as "It Ain't Gonna Rain No More" as well as his own compositions.

Career

In the 1980s, Fisher performed with Reverend Ken (Ramsden) and the Lost Followers; after Ramsden left, the group became Washboard Hank and the Honkers. In 1989 Fisher began co-hosting a show, "The Country Cousins" on Peterborough's Trent Radio.  The show was aired for more than 20 years.

In the 1990s, he performed for four years as a percussionist with Fred Eaglesmith and the Flying Squirrels, recording on his album 50-Odd Dollars.

In 2001, Fisher provided the music for an agitprop play, Where's the Care?, created by the group Ground Zero to protest cutbacks in healthcare services in Ontario. He also performed a lead role in the independent short film, Rigoletto... in Bluegrass in 2006.

He has toured with the Country Squires, and he also fronted his own band, the Gravestone Lickers.

Fisher performed on an Adventure Canada cruise ship to Greenland.  He also played locally with Catfish Willie and the Buckle Busters.

In 2012, Fisher performed at the  Alianait Arts Festival in Iqualuit, Nunavut.

Discography
Washboard Hank-Donkeys and Tire Fires1992
50-Odd Dollars - Flying Squirrels
Washboard Hank and the Country Squires 2003
Hooray for Washboard Hank - The Country Squires
Troubadour Tales - Kenny Butterill
Sweet Mysteries Of Life
Human Beans 2016

References

1954 births
Living people
Musicians from Peterborough, Ontario
Washboard players
Canadian children's musicians
Canadian folk musicians